The 2002 Purdue Boilermakers football team represented Purdue University in the 2002 NCAA Division I-A football season.  The team was coached by Joe Tiller and played its home games at Ross–Ade Stadium.  Purdue played thirteen games in the 2002 season, finishing with a 7–6 record and a victory in the Sun Bowl to Washington.

Schedule

Roster

Game summaries

Illinois State

The Boilermakers raced out to 27–0 lead early in the second quarter and never looked back vs. the overmatched Redbirds.  The Purdue offense rolled up 500+ total yards in the first-ever August game at newly refurbished Ross–Ade Stadium.

Notre Dame

With the help of 3 non-offensive TDs (2 Defense, 1 Special Team), Tyrone Willingham won his first Home game as coach of the Fighting Irish.  The Boilermakers got a 76-yard punt return TD from Anthony Chambers, RB Joey Harris ran for 125 yards, and WR John Standeford had 5 catches for 110 yards in the loss.

Western Michigan

Thanks to Western Michigan's potent dual-QB passing attack, the Boilermakers found themselves in a dogfight with the Broncos deep into the fourth quarter.  John Standeford (7 catches for 143 yards, 2TDs) caught game-winning TD with 5:26 to go.  Stuart Schweigert established Purdue interception record with his 12th career pick in the 4th quarter.

Wake Forest

The ACC's Demon Deacons rolled up almost 250 yards rushing to pull off the mild upset. Chris Barclay had three rushing TDs for the Deacs, who forced/benefitted from 5 turnovers and 3 missed 4th-quarter field goals that would have tied the game.  For Purdue, Kyle Orton had a productive passing day (24–43; 331 yds), Joey Harris ran for 120 yards, and John Standeford had a terrific performance (6–191) with 2 long TD receptions.

Minnesota

The Boilermakers improved to 3–2, using a strong third quarter performance to defeat previously unbeaten Minnesota in an evening tilt on ESPN2.  On the first play of the second half, strong safety Ralph Turner returned an interception for a TD.  Later, after linebacker Gilbert Gardner returned a fumble to the Gophers' 9-yard-line, defensive end Shaun Phillips lined up at tight end and caught a touchdown pass from Kyle Orton (19–32; 190 yds) in a goal-line situation.  Joey Harris ran for another 100+ yards in the win, while the Purdue defense limited Gophers' QB Asad Abdul-Khaliq to 33% passing on 48 attempts.

Iowa

Reserve DB Adolphus Shelton thwarted a promising final drive by intercepting backup QB Brandon Kirsch in the final seconds to preserve a thrilling win for the Hawkeyes that dropped Purdue to 3–3.  Amazingly clutch Iowa QB Brad Banks had just led the Hawkeyes on an 87-yard drive, culminating with a 4th down TD pass to TE Dallas Clark for what turned out to be the winning points.  The Purdue passing game moved the ball well with 400+ passing yards combined between Kyle Orton and the freshman Kirsch, who replaced the injured Orton and rallied the Boilermakers from a 24–14 deficit with two 4th quarter TD drives before Banks' heroics.  Ultimately, the Boilermakers were undone by big plays – two special teams miscues (blocked FG returned for TD, blocked punt returned for TD), and a 95-yard TD catch-and-run by Dallas Clark.

Illinois

After overcoming a 24–0 first half deficit, the Boilermakers fell to 3–4 in spectacular – and controversial – fashion in an exciting non-televised game.  The Illini (2–5) built their lead by returning the opening kickoff for a TD, then getting an 83-yard run from Antoineo Harris (who narrowly avoided a safety on the play), getting a 47-yard TD run from Harris (23 carries, 195 yards) and finally a Dustin Ward TD pass to Brandon Lloyd.  Freshman QB Brandon Kirsch relieved starting QB Kyle Orton for the second straight week with much success, rallying Purdue to a 31–24 lead in the 4th quarter.  Redshirt freshman RB Brandon Jones was a big part of the rally as well with 127 rushing yards and a 36-yard TD catch.

After Purdue's go-ahead score, Illinois mounted a long drive that came to a 4th and goal from the Purdue 1 yard line with 7 seconds left.  Despite protest from the Purdue coaching staff, officials ruled Antoineo Harris had crossed the goal line for a tying TD with 3 seconds remaining.  After downing a short squib kick, Kyle Orton re-entered to complete a "Hail Mary" pass to WR John Standeford, who made the catch near the end zone before being pushed back.  Officials ruled him down at the 1 yard line (despite further protest from the Purdue coaching staff), sending the game into overtime.  Illinois then won the game in OT, getting a TD catch from WR Greg Lewis, and then stopping Purdue at the 7 yard line on 4th down.

Purdue compiled almost 600 yards of offense, and LB Niko Koutouvides had 14 tackles in the painful loss.

Michigan

The Boilermakers fell to 3–5, losing by a close margin again, this time to the ninth-ranked  Wolverines.  In his first start QB Brandon Kirsch was effective throwing (172 yards) and running (81 yards), but 2 interceptions by QB Kyle Orton plus 2 missed FGs by Berin Lacevic proved fatal to the Boilermakers' upset bid.  Purdue closed the margin to 2 with RB Jerod Void's TD run with 8 seconds left in the game, but then Michigan recovered the ensuing onside kick.

WR Taylor Stubblefield had 11 catches for 104 yards for the Boilers in defeat.

Northwestern

The Boilermakers improved to 4–5 by running all over a young and undersized Wildcats' defense for a Joe Tiller-era record 407 yards.  RBs Joey Harris and Brandon Jones combined to run for nearly 300 yards, while QB Brandon Kirsch completed 8 of his 10 passes for 144 yards and 2 TDs.

Ohio State

As with all of their 2002 losses, Purdue suffered its 6th of the season to eventual national champion Ohio State in excruciating fashion.  It was a defensive struggle throughout, as the teams went into the half tied at 3 (Purdue' points were set up by a Niko Koutouvides interception).  In the 4th quarter, Purdue took a 6–3 lead thanks to a Berin Lacevic field goal after a 58-yard pass to freshman WR Ray Williams.

With less than 2 minutes remaining, the Buckeyes offense was given a short field after a Chris Gamble punt return. QB Craig Krenzel overcame a second down sack to complete a 3rd down and 14 pass to TE Ben Hartsock, setting up a 4th and 1 from Purdue's 36 yard line.  Under a heavy blitz, Krenzel threw deep for WR Michael Jenkins who caught the ball over the outstretched arm of CB Antwaun Rogers for the winning TD.  Purdue's final drive ended when 2-way player Chris Gamble intercepted a deep pass thrown by Kyle Orton, Orton's 3rd interception of the game.

This game has been dubbed the "Holy Buckeye" game, named for the Brent Musburger call of the winning play.

Michigan State

Two teams desperate to remain in the hunt for a bowl selection played a wild game that featured 7 lead changes.  In the end, Purdue (5–6) prevailed when QB Kyle Orton relieved an injured Brandon Kirsch on a late drive to throw a deep 4th down TD pass to WR John Standeford with just over 3 minutes left.  The defense then sealed the game by stopping a scrambling QB Damon Dowdell short of a first down near midfield in the closing minute.

Purdue had a terrific day on the ground, running for over 300 yards as a team thanks to QB Brandon Kirsch and RBs Joey Harris and Brandon Jones (125, 89, and 88 yards respectively).

Two all Big Ten WRs had phenomenal days. Purdue's Standeford had 5 catches for 136 yards and 2 scores, while the Spartans' Charles Rogers had 8 catches for 161 yards and 2 TDs.

Indiana

The Boilermakers qualified for their 6th bowl game in 6 years under Joe Tiller by reclaiming the Old Oaken Bucket from a depleted Indiana Hoosiers team in a decisive 34–10 win.  (Per the ESPN telecast, less than 50 players dressed for IU.)  The Purdue offense again shined, piling up 500+ yards behind another strong O-Line performance that enabled both Joey Harris and Brandon Jones to exceed 100 yards rushing. After an early long TD pass to John Standeford, QB Brandon Kirsch was replaced by Kyle Orton, who had a very efficient passing day with a 22–28; 173 yard performance.  Fifth year senior SS Ralph Turner capped his final home game with a game-clinching interception.

Sun Bowl

The Boilermakers finished a difficult but rewarding 2002 campaign by defeating their 2001 Rose Bowl opponent Washington Huskies by the same score of that contest 2 seasons prior, 34–24.

Purdue dug a big first quarter hole by committing numerous gaffes on offense (bad snap returned for TD) and special teams (punter mishandled the snap, turned into a short TD drive for the Huskies).  After that, however, the Boilermakers found a rhythm and took control of the game.  QB Kyle Orton had his best overall game of the season (25–37; 283 yards), backed by 17 combined catches from WRs John Standeford and Taylor Stubblefield as well as 93 rushing yards from Joey Harris.  Purdue's final TD game on a forced fumble for TD by LB Gilbert Gardner, and their final points came on a Berin Lacevic FG after a time-killing drive.

The 2002 Purdue Boilermakers, though they finished 7–6, nonetheless accomplished a rare feat; they finished ranked #1 in the Big Ten in total offense AND total defense yards per game.

References

Purdue
Purdue Boilermakers football seasons
Sun Bowl champion seasons
Purdue Boilermakers football